Malik Ambar (1548 – 13 May 1626) was a Siddi military leader, who served as the Peshwa (Prime Minister) of the Ahmadnagar Sultanate in the Deccan region of India.

Born in the Adal Sultunate, in present-day Ethiopia, Malik was sold by a slave merchant  and brought to India as a slave. While in India he created a mercenary force numbering greater than 50,000 men. It was based in the Deccan region and was hired by local kings. Malik became a popular Prime Minister of the Ahmadnagar Sultanate, showing administrative acumen. He is also regarded as a pioneer in guerrilla warfare in the region. He is credited with carrying out a revenue settlement of much of the Deccan, which formed the basis for subsequent settlements. He is a figure of veneration to the Siddis of Gujarat. He humbled the might of the Mughals and Adil Shahs of Bijapur and raised the low status of the Nizam Shah.

Early life
Malik Ambar was born in 1548 as Chapu, a birth-name in Harar. Mir Qasim Al Baghdadi, one of his slave owners eventually converted Chapu to Islam from Waaqeffanna and gave him the name Ambar, after recognizing his superior intellectual qualities. Ambar is believed by most sourcers have been of Oromo descent while other sources claim he was from the Maya tribe who never lived in Harar but in Wej .

Between the 14th and 17th centuries, the Oriental Orthodox Christian Ethiopian Empire (led by the Solomonic dynasty) and adjacent Muslim states gathered much of their slaves from non-Abrahamic communities inhabiting regions like Kambata, Damot and Hadya, which were located on the southern flanks of their territory. Malik Ambar was among the people who were converted to Islam, and later dispatched abroad to serve as a warrior.  According to the Futuhat-i `Adil Shahi, Malik Ambar was sold into slavery by his parents. He ended up in al-Mukha in Yemen, where he was sold again for 20 ducats and was taken to the slave market in Baghdad, where he was sold a third time to the Qadi al-Qudat of Mecca and again in Baghdad to Mir Qasim al-Baghdadi, who eventually took him to Deccan Plateau. He was described by the Dutch merchant Pieter van den Broecke as, "a black kafir from Abyssinia with a stern Roman face."

Malik Ambar was then purchased by Chengiz Khan, a former Habshi slave who served as the peshwa or chief minister of the Sultanate of Ahmadnagar.

Career

Once his master died, Malik Ambar was freed by his master's wife. He got married, and after getting freed, Ambar briefly served the Sultan of Bijapur and gained the title “Malik” during this time. But Ambar quit this service after citing insufficient support before entering service in the Nizam Shahi Army.

Malik Ambar was the regent of the Nizamshahi dynasty of Ahmednagar from 1600 to 1626. During this period he increased the strength and power of Murtaza Nizam Shah II and raised a large army. He raised a cavalry which grew from 150 to 7000 in a short period of time and revitalized the Ahmadnagar sultanate by appointing puppet sultans to repel Mughal attacks from the North. By 1610, his army grew to include 10,000 Habshis and 40,000 Deccanis. Over the course of the next decade, Malik Ambar would fight and defeat Mughal emperor Jahangir's attempts to take over the kingdom. Jahangir considered Malik Ambar his arch-nemesis and had publicly expressed his anger towards him. He criticized Ambar as “the ill-starred” and “the black fated”. Abu’l Hasan, a chief painter at Emperor Jahangir's court, has created a painting, under Jahangir's commission in 1615, depicting Jahangir shooting arrows at the severed head of Ambar.

Malik Ambar changed the capital from Paranda to Junnar and founded a new city, Khadki which was later on changed to Aurangabad by the Prince Aurangzeb in 1650s when he was viceroy of Deccan.

Malik Ambar is said to be one of the proponents of guerrilla warfare in the Deccan region. Malik Ambar assisted Shah Jahan wrestle power in Delhi from his stepmother, Nur Jahan, who had ambitions of seating her son-in-law on the throne. Malik Ambar had also restored some credibility to the Sultans of Ahmadnagar, who had been subdued by the earlier Mughals (Akbar had annexed Ahmadnagar). However, he was defeated later when Shah Jahan led a massive army against the dwindling Ahmednagar. Later Malik Ambar offered full control of Berar and Ahmadnagar to the Mughal as a sign of surrender.

Second conflict with Mughals
Malik Ambar defeated the Mughal General Khan Khanan many times and often attacked Ahmadnagar. Lakhuji Jadhavrao, Maloji Bhosale, Shahaji Bhosale, Ranoji Wable and other Maratha chiefs had gained great prominence during this period. With the help of these Maratha chiefs, Malik Ambar had captured Ahmednagar Fort and town from the Mughals. But in one of the battles Malik Ambar was defeated by the Mughals and had to surrender the fort of Ahmadnagar. Many Maratha Chiefs and especially Lakhuji Jadhavrao joined the Mughals after this. Shah Jahan once again laid a crushing blow to Malik Ambar in one of the battles and further decreased his power.

Death

He died in 1626 at the age of 77. Malik Ambar had by his Siddi wife, Bibi Karima two sons; Fateh Khan and Changiz Khan and two daughters.

Fateh Khan succeeded his father as the regent of the Nizam Shahs. However, he did not possess his predecessor's political and military prowess. Through a series of internal struggles within the nobility (which included Fateh Khan assassinating his nephew, Sultan Burhan Nizam Shah III), the sultanate fell to the Mughal Empire within ten years of Ambar's death.

One of his daughters was married to a prince of the Ahmednagar royal family who was later, through Malik Ambar's aid crowned as Sultan Murtaza Nizam Shah II. The eldest and youngest daughters respectively were called Shahir Bano and Azija Bano, the latter of whom married a nobleman named Siddi Abdullah.

His youngest daughter was married to the Circassian Commander of the Ahmednagar army, Muqarrab Khan, who later became a general under the Mughal Emperor and received the title Rustam Khan Bahadur Firauz Jang. He became famous for his involvement in several important military campaigns, such as the Kandahar Wars against Shah Abbas of Persia. He was killed by Prince Murad Baksh  in the Battle of Samugarh during the Mughal War of succession in 1658.

Malik Ambar's tomb lies in Khuldabad, near the shrine of the famous Sufi saint Zar Zari Baksh.

Legacy

There are conflicting perspectives on Ambar's long-term impact in Deccan, and its surrounding Indian states. Historians who subscribe to Harris's point of view credit the former slave with creating a long-lasting legacy of Africans rising to power in the eastern regions of the world, namely India. Others agree more with historians like Richard Eaton. He cites Ambar's military prowess as the reason he rose to such influence during his life, but claims that a string of decisive defeats at the end of his career instigated distrust and resentment amongst those in his close administration. Eaton and his proponents claim Ambar's journey is an impressive story of success, and gave African's representation in India for a short while, but also believe his lack of positive leadership in the final years of his tenure prevented him from solidifying his influence, as his successors quickly worked to reverse many of Ambar's policies. Regardless of his posthumous impact on the Deccan, and Indian states generally, it cannot be disputed Ambar was an avid supporter of education and a patron of the arts. Historians Joseph E. Harris and Chand cite Ambar's patron ship of the arts and learning as a shining achievement of his tenure as Malik of Deccan.

Malik Ambar cherished strong love and ability for architecture. Aurangabad was Ambar's architectural achievement and creation. Malik Ambar the founder of the city was always referred to by harsh names by Sultan Jahangir. In his memoirs, he never mentions his name without prefixing epithets like wretch, cursed fellow, Habshi, Ambar Siyari, black Ambar, and Ambar Badakhtur. Some historians believe that those words came out of frustration as Malik Ambar had resisted the powerful Mughals and kept them away from Deccan."

Foundation of Aurangabad
He founded/inhabited the city of Khirki in 1610. After his death in 1626, the name was changed to Fatehpur by his son and heir Fateh Khan. When Aurangzeb, the Mughal Emperor invaded Deccan in the year 1653, he made Fatehpur his capital and renamed it as Aurangabad. Since then it is known as Aurangabad. Two imperial capitals Viz. ‘Pratisthana’ (Paithan) i.e. the capital of Satavahanas (2nd BC to 3rd AD) and Devagiri – Daulatabad the capital of Yadavas and Muhammad bin Tughluq are located within the limits of Aurangabad District.

Aurangabad canal system
"Malik Ambar is especially famous for the Nahr or "Neher", the canal water supply system of the city called Khadki now known as Aurangabad. Malik Ambar completed the Neher within fifteen months, spending a nominal sum of two and a half lakh Rupiyahs. This city is situated on the banks of Kham, a small perennial stream which takes its rise in the neighbouring hills."

Water was supplied to the city of Khadki from the famous Panchakki (Pan from Hindi paani means water and Chakki means a treadmill) which drove the water down the Nahr e Ambari (Ambar's canal) from the stream called Kham referred earlier here, to the city. The blades of the Panchakki used to rotate by the water falling on them from that stream and with the aid of a wooden valve turn the flow into that canal, the Nahr, for the city.

The Canal was an impressive engineering feat as it consisted of a 7 feet deep tunnel large enough for a man to walk through. The Canal had 140 manholes and it worked efficiently without the need for any maintenance or cleaning for 321 years until it finally needed cleaning in 1931.

Janjira Fort

Malik Ambar is credited with the construction of the Janjira Fort in the Murud Area of present-day Maharashtra India. After its construction in 1567 AD, the fort was key to the Sidis withstanding various invasion attempts by the Marathas, Mughals, and Portuguese to capture Janjira.

See also
Neher water system

References

External links

Mentioned on page 9
Malik Ambar: A remarkable life B.N. Goswamy
The Tribune, Chandigarh, 13 August 2006, India Online edition
The African Diaspora in the Indian Ocean World, Omar H. Ali, Schomburg Center for Research in Black Culture

1549 births
1626 deaths
People from Aurangabad, Maharashtra
African warriors
Early Modern history of India
Military history of India
Siddhi people
Ahmadnagar Sultanate
People from Marathwada
Indian people of Ethiopian descent
People from Harari Region
Indian slaves
16th-century slaves
17th-century slaves